Mats Patrik Anttonen (born 6 March 1980) is a Swedish former professional footballer who played as a defender. He spent most of his career in his hometown club Örebro SK. He won one cap for the Sweden national team in 2009.

References

External links 
 
 
 
 

Swedish footballers
Sweden international footballers
1980 births
Living people
Association football defenders
Association football midfielders
Allsvenskan players
Örebro SK players
BK Forward players
Degerfors IF players
Sportspeople from Örebro